The Coiidae is an invalid family of fish supposedly related to the Lobotidae and the Datnioides (such as Datnioides microlepis). Their taxonomic position is disputed; they were once considered synonymous with the latter, and may be the same as Anabas.

See also
List of fish families

References

Percoidea
Perciformes families